Kearney, Nebraska is a center of media in south-central Nebraska. The following is a list of media outlets in the city.

Print

Newspapers
The Kearney Hub is the city's primary newspaper, published six days per week. In addition, the University of Nebraska at Kearney publishes a weekly student newspaper, The Antelope.

Radio
In its Fall 2013 ranking of radio markets by population, Arbitron ranked the Grand Island-Kearney-Hastings market 251st in the United States.

The following is a list of radio stations licensed to and/or broadcasting from Kearney:

AM

FM

Television
Kearney is a principal city of the Lincoln-Hastings-Kearney television market. The market includes the central portion of Nebraska as well as several counties in north-central Kansas.

The following is a list of television stations that broadcast from and/or are licensed to the city.

References

Mass media in Nebraska
Kearney, Nebraska